The University of Pinar del Río "Hermanos Saiz Montes de Oca" (Spanish: Universidad de Pinar del Río "Hermanos Saíz Montes de Oca", UPR) is a public university located in Pinar del Río, Cuba. It was founded in 1972.

See also 

Education in Cuba
List of universities in Cuba

References

External links
  

Universities in Cuba
University of Pinar del Rio
Educational institutions established in 1972
Buildings and structures in Pinar del Río Province